Bryngwyn is a village in Monmouthshire, Wales. It may also refer to:

Bryngwyn, Ceredigion, a small village in Ceredigion, Wales
Bryngwyn railway station, former railway terminus in Gwynedd, Wales
Bryngwyn Hall, historic house in Powys, Wales
Bryngwyn Manor, manor house in Much Dewchurch, Herefordshire
Bryn Gwyn, the name in Welsh Mythology for the hill and ancient fort now called Tower Hill and The Tower of London.
Castell Bryn Gwyn, a prehistoric site on Anglesey, featuring the Bryn Gwyn stones.